Arthur Rice may refer to:

 Arthur Rice, 6th Baron Dynevor (1836–1911), British peer
 Arthur W. Rice (1869–1938), architect in Boston